Brevidorsum is an extinct genus of dissorophoidean euskelian temnospondyl within the family Dissorophidae.

See also
 Prehistoric amphibian
 List of prehistoric amphibians

References 

Dissorophids
Cisuralian temnospondyls of North America
Prehistoric amphibian genera